Savave is an islet of Nukufetau, Tuvalu, which is on the lagoon side of Fale islet. It is also the name of the small village on the island. In the late 19th century, after the coming of the missionaries, the people of Nukufetau lived on Fale islet before shifting to Savave which is on the lagoon side of the Fale settlement.

In 1951 the school that was located on Motumua islet was transferred to Savave and became the government primary school for Nukufetau.  It was named the Tutasi Memorial School in honour of its predecessor.

References

Islands of Tuvalu
Populated places in Tuvalu
Pacific islands claimed under the Guano Islands Act
Nukufetau